The Ghost River Wilderness Area is a provincially designated wilderness area in the Canadian Rockies of Alberta protecting the headwaters of the Ghost River. It was established in 1967 and it, as one of the three Wilderness Areas of Alberta, has the strictest form of government protection available in Canada. All development is forbidden and only travel by foot is permitted. Hunting and fishing are not allowed. The other two Wilderness Areas are White Goat Wilderness Area and Siffleur Wilderness Area and together the three areas total .

Situated west of the city of Calgary and bordering Banff National Park, the Ghost Wilderness spans the area north of the Trans-Canada Highway (Highway 1) along the eastern slope of the Rocky Mountains up to the Red Deer River. It lies just slightly north of Lake Minnewanka. The area has rugged mountains, glacier-carved valleys, mountain lakes, and alpine meadows. There are two distinct vegetation zones. Above , the tree line, are grasses, sedges and wildflowers. Below that are subalpine forests of spruce, fir, and lodgepole pine. There are many rare species of butterflies. Animals include Bighorn Sheep, deer, moose, cougars, bears, wild horses, and timber wolves. The area is a world-class venue for ice climbing.

The area was also a filming location for the Academy Award-winning 1994 epic drama film Legends of the Fall.

References

External links
 Alberta Parks

Municipal District of Bighorn No. 8
Protected areas of Alberta
Parks in the Canadian Rockies